This article lists Forts and Gates that were constructed during Santo Domingo's colonial rule. Many of these forts were incorporated into a defensive wall that surrounded the Ciudad Colonial, effectively creating bastions along the wall.

There are also several gates which allowed access to the city, these gates were also protected by forts. A prime example is El Baluarte del Conde and La Puerta del Conde, where La Puerta del Conde served as an entrance to the city and El Baluarte served to protect the entrance.

Forts

Fuerte de la Concepcion
Fuerte de la Caridad
Fuerte de San Lazaro (Fort of Saint Lazarus)
Fuerte de San Miguel (Fort of Saint Michael)
Fuerte de San Francisco
El Fuerte de Santa Barbara
Fuerte de la Carena
Fuerte Invencible
Fortaleza Ozama, a sixteenth-century castle that overlooks the Ozama River.
Fuerte San Gil
Fuerte de San Jose (Fort of Saint Joseph)
Fuerte de Angulo

Gates

Puerta del Conde (The Count's Gate), was the only entrance to the north and the furthest boundary of the city until around the late 19th century.
Puerta de la Atarazans
Puertas de San Diego, built by Alejandro de Fuenmayor in 1540
Puerta de la Misericordia (Gates of Mercy)

See also 
 List of museums in the Dominican Republic

References

Monuments and memorials in the Dominican Republic
Forts in the Dominican Republic
Spanish colonial fortifications in the Dominican Republic
Santo Domingo
Forts